András Dlusztus (born 22 July 1988) is a Hungarian former football player.

References 
 HLSZ
 
 

1988 births
Living people
Sportspeople from Szeged
Hungarian footballers
Association football defenders
Tisza Volán SC footballers
Makó FC footballers
Fortaleza Esporte Clube players
Fluminense de Feira Futebol Clube players
FC Sopron players
Lombard-Pápa TFC footballers
SZEOL SC players
Vác FC players
Békéscsaba 1912 Előre footballers
Dorogi FC footballers
Nemzeti Bajnokság I players
Nemzeti Bajnokság II players
Nemzeti Bajnokság III players
Hungarian expatriate footballers
Expatriate footballers in Brazil
Hungarian expatriate sportspeople in Brazil